Luis Francisco Zubeldía (born 13 January 1981) is an Argentine football manager and former player. He is the current manager of Ecuadorian club LDU Quito.

A former midfielder, Zubeldía's career was mainly associated to Club Atlético Lanús, where he played as a senior and managed the club in two different spells. He was known for being the youngest person to be in charge of an Argentine first division professional soccer team.

Playing career

Club
Born in Santa Rosa, La Pampa, Zubeldía debuted at Club Atlético Lanús on 30 October 1998 with a draw at home by 2 goals against Independiente. He made 57 appearances, scoring 3 goals. In 2004, he retired from football at 23 years of age due to a osteochondritis dissecans of his knee.

International
He played for the U-17 and U-20 Argentina selections. He was part of the Argentine squad at the South American and World Under-17 1997 and the FIFA U-20 1999. He was also part of the South American Under-20 Championship 2001. That same year, days before the start of the Under-20 that was organized in Argentina, he suffered an injury on the left knee.

Managing career

Club Atlético Lanús (1st cycle) 
In June 2008, Zubeldia was announced as manager of Lanús, replacing Ramón Cabrero, at the age of 27, making him the youngest coach in the history of First Division Argentina. After leading the team to fourth place in the Torneo Apertura 2008 and qualifying 2009 Copa Libertadores, Lanús ended Torneo Clausura 2009 in third place. Under his technical leadership, Lanus finished the 2008/2009 season as the best team, with a total of 75 points. So far, this is the best record in club history. On 15 November, he left the team.

Barcelona SC
On 23 June 2011, he was hired to direct the Barcelona Sporting Club with a contract for 18 months until the end of 2012. On 8 April 2012, after a 1–1 tie against Liga de Quito, the president of Barcelona, Antonio Noboa, entered the dressing rooms, having a strong discussion with the young coach. After discussion, the next day Luis Zubeldía gave a press conference announcing his irrevocable resignation to Barcelona, which stated:

His replacement was his compatriot Gustavo Costas. At the end of 2012, Barcelona was crowned Ecuadorian Serie A Champion after almost 15 years. Zubeldía was recognized for his role in putting together the team that won the championship.

Racing Club De Avellaneda
In the middle of Torneo Clausura 2012, Zubeldía took over the technical direction of Racing Club de Avellaneda replacing Alfio Basile, accompanied by the same body technician in his previous teams: Snapper Maximilian as adjutant and Pablo Sanchez as a trainer. The group led by Zubeldía managed to reach the end of the Copa Argentina 2011/2012, after his team beat penalties to River Plate, being Saja the hot-shot. In the end, Racing lost 2–1 against Boca Juniors.

Luis Zubeldía took hold in the first team several youth of the lower, as Ricardo Centurión, Rodrigo De Paul, Luis Fariña and Luciano Vietto. In 2012 Initial Tournament Racing achieved the best season the club in short matches from the championship got "Mostaza" Merlo in Torneo Apertura 2001 (42 points). Racing finished in fifth place with a total of 33 points, won 9 games, 6 draws, and 4 defeats, with 26 goals for and 12 against. In the final tournament in 2013, Racing achieved sixth place with 8 games won, tied 5, and lost 6 with 24 goals for and 17 against. Because of these two seasons, Zubledía's team ends up being the highlight of the past 12 seasons. On 25 August 2013, he was dismissed by the leadership due to a bad start to the season.

Liga de Quito

After the departure of manager Edgardo Bauza from Liga de Quito, the leader of the club decided to hire the strategist Luis Francisco Zubeldía as a replacement to lead the 2014 season. On 18 January, the Argentine made his presentation during the "Noche Blanca" presentation match against América de Cali, winning the match 3–0.
The start of the 2014 season had a surplus balance the participation of several young players on the professional staff as Luis Cangá, Jefferson Intriago, Hancel Batalla, and Francisco Cevallos. These players, plus more experienced players, made Liga de Quito qualify for the Copa Sudamericana 2015 a goal set at the beginning of the year.
After rumors that Luis Zubeldia would be hired by Leon of Mexico, the Argentine decided to renew for another year for the Quito institution.

In 2015, Liga de Quito became the winner of the first stage of Ecuadorian Serie A with 47 points after earning a record of 21 unbeaten dates. Thus, he qualified for the 2015 tournament finals and won the qualification for the 2016 Copa Libertadores.
After his team classified first in the regular phase with 89 points in 44 games, one point ahead of Club Sport Emelec, they played the final of the Ecuadorian Serie A 2015 with two home and away matches against Club Sport Emelec on 16 and 20 December, obtaining the sub championship after losing 1–3 and 0–0 draw against Emelec in Portoviejo and Quito, respectively, which closed his cycle in the team from the capital of Ecuador.

Santos Laguna
On 28 November 2015, Zubeldía announced that he would go to Santos Laguna once he completed the Ecuadorian tournament with Liga de Quito to Clausura 2016 of Mexican tournament. This statement made a few players upset since the team could be the champion without having to play against Emelec. In the last matches, there weren't good results and Liga de Quito didn't manage to become champion and lost the finals against the other team. In his debut, he achieved a very good performance by placing the team within the last eight of the Liga MX. The team also reached the semi-finals of the Champions League FA Cup, being eliminated by the Americans after dramatic overtime. During the period of preparation in the United States, Santos achieved the Socio Cup Mx, conquering Pumas and later the mighty Cruz Azul. On 15 August 2016, it was surprisingly dismissed by leadership, due to a bad start to the season.

Independiente Medellín
He was presented as the new technical director of the Deportivo Independiente Medellín on 14 December 2016 as a replacement of Leonel Álvarez for 2017. There were challenges like participating directly on the groups' stage in the Copa Libertadores de América, besides the Liga Águila, the Superliga Ágila and the Copa Águila. He resigned on 6 July 2017.

Deportivo Alavés
His arrival to Spain was made official on 17 June 2017 as the new trainer of the Deportivo Alavés. He only signed for one season as a replacement to Mauricio Pellegrino. He was fired on 17 September after losing the first 4 matches of the Liga.

Cerro Porteño
On 3 February 2018, Luis Zebeldía signs a whole year as a trainer for (at the moment) Paraguayan champion Club Cerro Porteño in replacement of the Colombian Leonel Álvarez, who resigned after some differences with the director of the club.

Club Atlético Lanús (2nd cycle)
Zubeldía returned to Lanús on 3 September 2018, replacing Ezequiel Carboni as coach.

Personal life
He is the brother of trainer Gustavo Zubeldía and former soccer player Juan Zubeldía.

Managerial statistics

As a player

As a trainer

Notes

References

External links
 Luis Zubeldía – The Rising Star of Coaches at Argentina Football World 
 Argentine Primera managerial statistics at Fútbol XXI  
 Argentine Primera playing statistics at Fútbol XXI  
 A ritmo de Tango: Luis Zubeldía, el exitoso técnico precoz at Notas de Futbol 

1981 births
Living people
People from Santa Rosa, La Pampa
Argentine people of Basque descent
Argentine footballers
Argentina under-20 international footballers
Argentina youth international footballers
Association football midfielders
Argentine Primera División players
Club Atlético Lanús footballers
Argentine football managers
Club Atlético Lanús managers
Barcelona S.C. managers
L.D.U. Quito managers
Independiente Medellín managers
Deportivo Alavés managers
Cerro Porteño managers
Argentine expatriate football managers
Expatriate football managers in Spain
Argentine expatriate sportspeople in Spain